Secondary Highway 502, commonly referred to as Highway 502, is a provincially maintained secondary highway in the Canadian province of Ontario. It also carries the Great River Road designation.

The route was constructed throughout the mid- to late 1970s as a new connection between Highway 11 and Highway 17, known as the Manitou Road. It opened in 1980. Another Highway 502 existed between 1956 and 1973, a short alternative route to Highway 2 near Napanee.

Route description 
It progresses north through an isolated region dominated by the forests, exposed bedrock, rivers, numerous lakes, muskeg and mountains of the Canadian Shield, encountering no communities or significant roads along its  route; it does provide access to numerous logging and mineral access roads.

On an average day, approximately 520 vehicles use the highway at the southern terminus, while approximately 420 vehicles use the highway at the northern terminus. These represent the heaviest and lightest travelled portions of the route, respectively.

History 
Historically, the Ontario Highway 502 designation has been used on two different, unrelated roads: the Belleville Road between Marysville and Napanee,
and the Fort Frances–Dryden Highway in northwestern Ontario.

Belleville Road 
Prior to the completion of Highway 401 near Napanee, Highway 2 formed the backbone of the provincial highway network and served as the main corridor between Toronto, Kingston, Montreal, and other cities and towns along the north shore of Lake Ontario and the Saint Lawrence River.
To the west of Napanee, Highway 2 turned south at Marysville to travel through Deseronto and along the shoreline of the Bay of Quinte and Napanee River, rather than the more direct route along Belleville Road. Highway 502 was designated alongside many other secondary highways on May 9, 1956. It was the southernmost secondary highway in the province.

The section of Highway 401 parallel to Belleville Road was one of the final links in the trans-provincial freeway. By early 1963,
the freeway had opened as a four lane route west of Wyman Road near Marysville, and as a two lane route (along the future eastbound lanes) east of Napanee. The future eastbound lanes between Wyman Road and Napanee opened in the fall of 1962; the westbound lanes were opened in the fall of 1964, completing Highway 401 between Toronto and Kingston.

The opening of Highway 401 resulted in a sharp reduction in traffic volume along Highway 2 and consequently Highway 502. Highway 502 was decommissioned and transferred to Hastings County and Lennox and Addington County in 1973.
Today the former highways is known as Hastings County Road 24 and Lennox and Addington County Road 1.

Northern Ontario 
In 1972, planning began for a new route between Highway 11 near Fort Frances and Highway 17 near Dryden. During construction, the route was referred to as the Manitou Road.
The Manitou Road was officially opened on October 31, 1980, and redesignated as Highway 502.
It has remained unchanged since then.

For several years in the late 1990s and early 2000s, the highway became used by trucking traffic as an alternative to Ontario Highway 71, after load restrictions were placed on the Sioux Narrows Bridge.

Major intersections

References 

502
Roads in Kenora District
Roads in Rainy River District